Hillman GT may refer to:

 a variant of the Hillman Hunter, an automobile produced by Chrysler Europe
 a variant of the Hillman Imp, an automobile produced by Chrysler Australia

GT